The Freemen (Admission) Act 1763 (3 Geo 3 c 15), sometimes called the Freeman (Admission) Act 1763, was an Act of the Parliament of Great Britain. The Act withheld the right to vote in Parliamentary elections, in those boroughs where honorary freemen could vote, from any freemen admitted to the freedom within twelve months of the first day of the election; it did not affect the rights of ordinary freemen, admitted by the custom of the borough in question.

The Act was passed in response to a number of instances of large numbers of non-resident honorary freemen being created to sway the results of elections, often after the writ for an election had been issued. At an election for Durham City in 1761, 215 new freemen, mostly non-resident, had been created after the issue of the writ and had proved decisive in a total poll of around 1,500. After the result was overturned on petition a bill was introduced to check this abuse, and the Act was consequently known colloquially as the Durham Act.

References
 Lewis Namier & John Brooke, The History of Parliament: The House of Commons 1754-1790  (London: HMSO, 1964)
 Edward Porritt and Annie G Porritt, The Unreformed House of Commons (Cambridge University Press, 1903)

External links
 Text of the Freeman (Admission) Act 1763

Great Britain Acts of Parliament 1763
Election law in the United Kingdom
Election legislation
1763 in law